Christopher Keith Wormley (born October 25, 1993) is an American football defensive end for the Pittsburgh Steelers of the National Football League (NFL). He played college football at Michigan.

Early years
Wormley was born in 1993. He attended Whitmer High School in Toledo, Ohio, where he was an all-state football player.

College career
Wormley enrolled at the University of Michigan in 2012.  During summer training camp in August 2012, Wormley sustained a torn anterior cruciate ligament, did not play during the 2012 season, and received a medical redshirt. As a redshirt freshman in 2013, he appeared in 13 games as a backup defensive lineman. As a redshirt sophomore in 2014, Wormley appeared in 12 games, six as a starter.

As a redshirt junior in 2015, Wormley appeared in 12 games, including 10 as a starter. He totaled two sacks and eight tackles for loss in the 2015 season.

In 2016, Wormley returned to Michigan as a fifth-year, redshirt senior. In August 2016, Wormley and tight end Jake Butt were selected by a vote of their teammates as the team captains for the 2016 Michigan team.  He was also named to the watch lists for the Bronko Nagurski Trophy and Chuck Bednarik Award as the best defensive player in college football. On September 10, 2016, he blocked two field goal attempts in a 51-14 victory over UCF. During the 2016 season, Wormley recorded 39 tackles, with nine tackles-for-loss, and finished second on the team with six sacks.

Following the 2016 season, Wormley was named to the All-Big Ten defensive first-team, by the coaches, and was named a Second-team All-American by Sporting News.

Professional career

Baltimore Ravens
Wormley was drafted by the Baltimore Ravens in the third round, 74th overall, in the 2017 NFL Draft. The Ravens had previously obtained the selection used to pick Wormley by trading Timmy Jernigan to the Philadelphia Eagles.

On October 8, 2017, Wormley made his NFL debut, logging 24 snaps and recording his first-career tackle against the Oakland Raiders. The next week Wormley made his first-career start against the Chicago Bears, recording two tackles and his first quarterback hit. He ended his rookie season appearing in 7 games with 2 starts, logging five tackles and a quarterback hit.

On September 9, 2018, Wormley recorded two pass breakups against the Buffalo Bills, the first of his career. The next week he recorded his first tackle for loss against the Cincinnati Bengals. On October 14, Wormley recorded his first sack of his career against the Tennessee Titans. He recorded a career-high 3 tackles against the New Orleans Saints. He ended his sophomore season appearing in all 16 games with 6 starts, recording 16 tackles, two tackles for loss, two quarterback hits, five pass deflections, and a sack.

On November 10, 2019, Wormley recorded his second-career sack against the Cincinnati Bengals and reached career-highs in tackles (4), TFLs (2), and quarterback hits (2).

Pittsburgh Steelers
On March 20, 2020, Wormley was traded to the Pittsburgh Steelers along with a 2021 seventh-round pick, for the Steelers 2021 fifth-round draft pick. The trade was a rare one between the archrivals, who at that point had made only one other trade since the Ravens moved to Baltimore in 1996. Wormley was placed on injured reserve on October 31, 2020, after suffering a knee injury in Week 7. He was activated on November 21, 2020. In Week 17 against the Cleveland Browns, Wormley recorded his first sack as a Steeler on Baker Mayfield during the 24–22 loss.

Wormley re-signed with the Steelers on a two-year contract on March 22, 2021.

References

External links
Pittsburgh Steelers bio
Michigan Wolverines bio

1993 births
All-American college football players
American football defensive ends
American football defensive tackles
Baltimore Ravens players
Living people
Michigan Wolverines football players
Pittsburgh Steelers players
Players of American football from Ohio
Sportspeople from Toledo, Ohio